, is a Japanese actress. From 1999 to 2005, she was an member of Takarazuka Revue. She is well known for her role as Yukimi Igarashi in Kamen Rider Revice.

Biography 
In 1997, Kurara entered Takarazuka Music School.

Filmography

Television

Film

References

External links 

 Official profile
 Official Instagram account

Living people
1979 births

Japanese stage actresses
Japanese actresses